Médard Autsai Asenga (born 2 January 1942) is a Congolese politician who was governor of the former Orientale Province, and later a National Representative.

Origins

Médard Autsai Asenga was born in 1942.
He was born into a modest family in Aru, Ituri Province, his mother's only son.
He is a practicing Christian.

Governor of Orientale

Autsai was governor of Orientale Province from  24 February 2007 to 5 March 2012.
On 30 April 2010 Asenga was made Grand Commander of the National Order of the Leopard, the highest civilian decoration in the country.
On 9 October 2010 In October 2010 Autsai was present at a ceremony where a large delivery of election equipment arrived by boat in Kisangani.
It had been shipped from Kinshasa by the United Nations Organisation Stabilisation Mission in the DR Congo (MONUSCO).
Autsai Asenga thanked MUNUSCO and expressed hope that it would be put to good use.

National deputy

Autsai was elected to the National Assembly for the Aru Territory, running on the PPRD platform.
He took office on 6 March 2012, and resigned from his position as governor of Orientale.
In May 2012 a group of provincial deputies representing the four districts of Orientale Province demanded that the Independent National Electoral Commission (Ceni) organize an election to replace the interim governor Ismaël Arama Ndiama who had replaced him, since an interim governor could not effectively deal with major issues faced by the province.

His son, Patrice Adriko Autsai, was later elected national deputy for Aru.

References

1942 births
Living people
Governors of Orientale Province
Governors of provinces of the Democratic Republic of the Congo
Members of the National Assembly (Democratic Republic of the Congo)